The Anchorage-class dock landing ships were a series of five dock landing ships (LSD) constructed and commissioned by the United States Navy between 1965 and 1972.  US Navy decommissioned all five of them by 2003. They are succeeded by Whidbey Island-class LSDs and Harpers Ferry-class LSDs.

Design and development
The Anchorage class of dock landing ships was built as a replacement for the remaining aging war-built LSDs of the Ashland and Casa Grande classes. Their principal intended role was to carry additional landing craft to supplement those carried by the Amphibious transport docks (LPD)s, which carried less landing craft in order to accommodate more troops and cargo.

The Anchorage class was slightly larger than the preceding Thomaston class, but were of generally similar design, with a large Well dock aft to accommodate landing craft, and a removable flight deck fitted above the well deck to allow the operation of helicopters, although no hangar was provided. The ship could carry 375 troops compared with the 345 carried by the Thomastons, while  of vehicle parking space was provided.

As built, the ships had a defensive armament of eight 3"/50 Mark 33 anti-aircraft guns in four twin mounts, while major sensors included SPS-10 surface search radar and SPS-40 air-search radar.

Construction and service
The name ship of the class,  was ordered under the Fiscal year 1965 (FY65) shipbuilding program, with three more (and ) ordered under the FY66 program and the final ship of the class, under the FY67 programme. They were laid down between 1967 and 1970 and entered service between 1969 and 1972.

The fire-control directors for the 3 in guns were removed in the late 1970s, while the ships' gun armament was gradually reduced, with two mounts removed by 1990, and the remaining 3 inch guns removed by 1994. Two 20mm Phalanx CIWS mounts to defend against anti-ship missiles and two 25 mm Bushmaster cannon to defend against surface targets were fitted to replace these weapons.

Ship List

References 

 Anchorage class dock landing ship